Pablo Antonio Villanueva Ramírez (born 29 June 1957) is a Mexican politician affiliated with the National Action Party. As of 2014 he served as Deputy of the LIX Legislature of the Mexican Congress representing Michoacán.

References

1957 births
Living people
People from Morelia
Politicians from Michoacán
National Action Party (Mexico) politicians
Universidad del Valle de Atemajac alumni
Members of the Congress of Michoacán
20th-century Mexican politicians
21st-century Mexican politicians
Deputies of the LIX Legislature of Mexico
Members of the Chamber of Deputies (Mexico) for Michoacán